William Salter (died 1404) was an English politician.

Life
Salter was from Devizes, Wiltshire, and represented his town in Parliament. He was a weaver, and one of the wealthiest men in his area. He was married to Margaret, and they had one daughter. His grandson, Richard Bytefynger, was his main heir.

Career
Salter was Member of Parliament for Devizes in February 1383, 1386, February 1388, January 1397, September 1397 and 1399.

References

Year of birth missing
1404 deaths
14th-century births
15th-century English people
English MPs February 1383
People from Devizes
English MPs 1386
English MPs February 1388
English MPs January 1397
English MPs September 1397
English MPs 1399